William 'Bill' King (September 15, 1930 - December 3, 2020) was a former British Columbia politician from Revelstoke. King was a member of Dave Barrett's 1972 BC NDP provincial government, serving in the post of Minister of Labour.

King was born in Tisdale, Saskatchewan to Irish immigrants Patrick and Minnie King. He married Audrey Lennard on October 10, 1953, with whom he had two children, Linda and William Jr. He attended Nelson High School in Nelson, BC and the Labour College of Canada at the University of Montreal in 1967.

He entered politics as a teenager in 1943, when he acted as a runner between polling stations and the campaign headquarters of Herbert Herridge, CCF MLA for Rossland-Trail. After moving to Revelstoke in 1952, he became an organizer for the CCF at the constituency level and worked on Vincent Segur's campaign in the 1952 provincial election. In 1960 King served as campaign manager for George Hobbs, who won the Revelstoke-Slocan seat for the CCF.

King was first elected to the BC provincial legislature in the Revelstoke-Slocan constituency on July 15, 1968 in a by-election, but was defeated in the 1969 General Election.

He was re-elected in 1972, when the New Democratic Party became the government.  Premier Dave Barrett appointed King Minister of Labour. During his time as Minister of Labour, King introduced BC's first Labour Code and Human Rights legislation, which took jurisdiction over strikes and picketing away from courts which tended to issue many ex parte injunctions against labour unions, and transferred it to a Labour Relations Board with broad powers. King was also the first to appoint women to key civil service positions in BC.

In the general election of 1975, NDP leader Dave Barrett lost his seat in the Legislature. King served as Leader of the Opposition until Barrett returned to the House upon winning a by-election in June 1976.

King was elected as the first MLA for the new riding of Shuswap-Revelstoke in the 1979 general election but was defeated in the 1983 British Columbia general election. He returned to his previous job at the Canadian Pacific Railway in Revelstoke for three years before retiring in 1986.

References 

British Columbia New Democratic Party MLAs
Canadian people of Irish descent
Canadian socialists
Members of the Executive Council of British Columbia
1930 births
2020 deaths
People from Revelstoke, British Columbia
People from Tisdale, Saskatchewan